Amaretto di Saronno may refer to:

 Amaretti di Saronno
 Amaretto Disaronno Originale